Cipollini may refer to:

 A small cipolla, the Italian name for onion
 Leopoldia comosa, also called Muscari comosum and tassel hyacinth
 Alé–Cipollini, a professional cycling team based in Italy

People 
 Cesare Cipollini (born 1958), Italian former cyclist
 Mario Cipollini (born 1967), retired Italian professional road cyclist
 Renato Cipollini (born 1945), retired Italian professional football player
 Joey Cipollini, fictional character in the TV series The Sopranos

See also

 
 Cipollone
 Cipollina (disambiguation)
 Cipollino (disambiguation)
 Chipolin (disambiguation)
 Cipolla (disambiguation)